Ta'lab was a god worshipped in ancient Yemen, particularly by Sumʿay tribes. Ta'lab was the moon god and also a protector of pastures. Ta'lab means goat, as well as it is one of the holy animals for southern Arabs. His oracle was consulted for advice.  A shrine dedicated to him existed in Jabal Riyam in north Sana'a.

Gallery

References

Arabian gods
Lunar gods
Oracular gods